Claisebrook Road is a road in Perth, Western Australia that originally ran between Summers Street in the north to Wittenoom St, East Perth in the south.

History 
Claisebrook Road ran downhill from Summers Street past the East Perth Primary School on the corner of Wittenoom Street, and when it rained run-off would flood the school.

Intersections

References

Streets in Perth, Western Australia